St Peter's Square is a public square in Manchester city centre, England. The north of the square is bounded by Princess Street and the south by Peter Street. To the west of the square is Manchester Central Library, Midland Hotel and Manchester Town Hall Extension. The square is home to the Manchester Cenotaph, the Emmeline Pankhurst statue, and St Peter's Square Metrolink tram stop and incorporates the Peace Garden. In 1819, the area around the square was the site of the Peterloo Massacre.

From 2010 to 2017, the square underwent significant redevelopment which entailed the restoration of Central Library and attached Library Walk link, the relocation of the Cenotaph to the rear of Manchester Town Hall, the creation of a new extended tram stop and the construction of two new office blocks to the south of the square; One St Peter's Square and Two St Peter's Square.

History

The area around St Peter's Square, then known as St Peter's Field,  was the site of the 1819 Peterloo Massacre. The name derives from St Peter's Church which was built in 1788-94 where the gardens are today and also gave its name to Peter Street. The church was built in the neoclassical style by the architect James Wyatt, and was once famous for its church music. It was demolished in 1907 and the Cenotaph replaced it in 1924. A stone cross (1908) commemorates the church. The square is the site for the city's Remembrance Day commemoration each year.

In the 1930s, the square was redeveloped around the construction of the Central Library and Town Hall Extension (1930–34). Plans for a rapid transit station in St Peter's Square were made in the 1970s; proposals for the abandoned Picc-Vic tunnel envisaged the construction of an underground station to serve both St Peter's and the neighbouring Albert Square. The early proposals for an on-street light rail system in Manchester revived the idea of a station in the square, and the idea was retained as the project evolved, becoming a reality when the Metrolink system opened in 1992.

Redevelopment

In 2013, Manchester City Council approved plans for the redevelopment of the square, including the expansion of the Metrolink stop to four platforms. This coincided with the construction of the One and Two St Peter's Square buildings and the refurbishment of Manchester Central Library, both adjacent to the square. Numerous archaeological finds were made when construction work uncovered the former crypt of the long-demolished St. Peter's Church, which had a concrete raft built over it in order to safely construct the new tram lines. The outline of the church is marked in the paving around the square.

The scheme involved using £20 million of public money, moving the Cenotaph, moving the Peace Gardens, demolishing an inter-war building to establish a new office quarter and closing Library Walk to the public. The plans were criticised as bland, unrealistic and private sector orientated rather than public orientated.

In response to the criticisms Darryl Lee, director of Mosley Street Ventures, said: "The developers have had lengthy and detailed discussions about their proposals with English Heritage and Manchester City Council, who have pronounced themselves happy with the scheme". An English Heritage spokesperson added: "Long before Century House was built, St Peter’s Square was envisaged as a grand civic space, and English Heritage feels that the Simpson scheme, taken with other developments which are under way, goes some way to realising that ambition. While we think that Century House makes a positive contribution to the conservation area, we feel that its loss is outweighed by the public benefits of the scheme."

A statue of Emmeline Pankhurst was unveiled on 14 December 2018 to commemorate 100 years since women were first allowed to vote in United Kingdom general elections.

Monuments and statues

Manchester Cenotaph

This is the work of Sir Edwin Lutyens and has similarities to the Cenotaph in Whitehall, London.  It was inaugurated in 1924 and the ceremonies of Remembrance Day have been observed here annually since then. In 2014 the cenotaph was relocated to the north-east end of the square; opposite the Cooper Street entrance to the Town Hall.

References

Squares in Manchester
Peterloo massacre